UCB may stand for:

Banking
 UCB Home Loans, a mortgage lender in the UK
 Uganda Commercial Bank, a former state-owned bank in Uganda
 United Carolina Bank, a former bank based in North Carolina, USA
 Union Commercial Bank, former name of Mauritius Commercial Bank (Madagascar)
 United Commercial Bank Ltd, a private bank in Bangladesh

Education

Universities
 University of California, Berkeley, in the U.S. state of California
 Umwelt-Campus Birkenfeld, a branch of the Trier University of Applied Sciences in the German state of Rhineland-Palatinate
 Universidad Central de Bayamón, a private Catholic university in the U.S. territory of Puerto Rico
 Universidade Católica de Brasília, a private Catholic university in Brazil
 University College of Bahrain, in Saar, Bahrain
 University College, Bangor, predecessor to Bangor University, in Wales, United Kingdom
 University College of Bangor, a campus of the University of Maine at Augusta, in the U.S. state of Maine
 University College Birmingham, in England, United Kingdom
 University College at Buckingham, predecessor to University of Buckingham, in England, United Kingdom
 University of Colorado Boulder, in the U.S. state of Colorado

Other schools
 Uva College, Badulla, a public boys school in Sri Lanka

Art, entertainment, and media
 Upright Citizens Brigade, a US comedy group
 Uncalled 4 Band, a popular go-go band from Washington, D.C.
 United Christian Broadcasters, an international broadcasting organisation

Other uses
 UCB (company), a global biopharmaceutical manufacturer
 Ulanqab Jining Airport, IATA code UCB
 Unconjugated Bilirubin, in clinical biochemistry, the yellow breakdown product of normal heme catabolism
 Union of Burkinabé Communists, a political party in Burkina Faso in the 1980s
 Unit Control Block, in computing, an area of memory in IBM's z/OS
 United Cricket Board of South Africa, a former name of the governing body of cricket in South Africa
 Upper Confidence Bounds, a term in the confidence interval method, an AI method used in Monte Carlo tree search & multi-armed bandits

See also